Frank J. Trigilio (January 19, 1919 – March 5, 1992) was an American football fullback who played one season in the All-America Football Conference with the Los Angeles Dons and Miami Seahawks. He first enrolled at the University of Vermont before transferring to Alfred University. He attended Oakfield High School in Oakfield, New York.

References

External links
Just Sports Stats

1919 births
1992 deaths
Players of American football from New York (state)
American football fullbacks
Vermont Catamounts football players
Alfred Saxons football players
Los Angeles Dons players
Miami Seahawks players